The men's singles snooker competition at the 2009 World Games took place between 22 and 26 July at the Chung Cheng Martial Arts Stadium in Kaohsiung, Taiwan.

Last 16

Last 8

References

Snooker - men's singles
World Games
Snooker at the World Games